William Holton Campfield  (February 19, 1868 – May 16, 1952) was an American pitcher in Major League Baseball who played for the New York Giants in its 1896 season.

External links
 

Major League Baseball pitchers
Baseball players from Pennsylvania
People from Meadville, Pennsylvania
New York Giants (NL) players
1868 births
1952 deaths
19th-century baseball players
Atlanta Firecrackers players
Binghamton Bingoes players
Wilkes-Barre Coal Barons players
Sharon Ironmongers players
Dallas Navigators players